Huntingfield is the name of a number of places.

Huntingfield, Suffolk, England.
Huntingfield, Tasmania, Australia